Kyzyl-Barzhau (Qıźıl Bäryäw) is a rural locality (a village) in Novokulevsky Selsoviet, Nurimanovsky District, Bashkortostan, Russia. The population was 55 as of 2010. There is 1 street.

Geography 
Kyzyl-Barzhau is located 24 km south of Krasnaya Gorka (the district's administrative centre) by road. Gizyatovo is the nearest rural locality.

References 

Rural localities in Nurimanovsky District